Puerto Rico's Poignant... Powerful... Incomparable... is the first (1st) studio album by Puerto Rican singer Yolandita Monge under the label Patty Records. It was released in 1969, when she was only 14 years old. It includes the radio hits Vida and El Resfriado.

The album was re-released in the early 1990s by the label Disco Hit in cassette format re-titled as "Sus Grandes Exitos".  It is currently out of print in all media layouts.

Track listing

Credits and personnel
Vocals: Yolandita Monge
Musical Arrangements: Máximo Torres, Julio Rivero
Spanish Translations of Tracks 1, 2, 3, 5, 6, 7, 9 & 10: Tite Curet Alonso

Notes
Track listing and credits from album cover.
Re-released in Cassette Format by Disco Hit Productions/Aponte Latin Music Distribution (DHC-1622) re-titled as "Sus Grandes Exitos".

References

Yolandita Monge albums
1969 debut albums
Spanish-language albums